Herman Makkink (21 October, 1937 – 20 October 2013) was a Dutch sculptor, graphic artist and illustrator.

Life and work

Makkink was born in Winschoten. After studying chemistry from 1955 to 1959 in Groningen, Makkink began to walk and hitchhike around the world, a phase in his life he described in the book Around the world on foot and which he sold to various newspapers, mainly in Southeast Asia. He worked in Japan as an English teacher and also travelled through Australia and Central America. He began to sculpt in the United States, when he made his first assemblage of scrap metal. After a short stay in Greece, he moved to London and became technical assistant at the London College of Printing. In London, he participated in several group exhibitions.

His first solo exhibition, "Gnomes", was mounted at the Courtauld Institute of Art in 1971. Makkink worked with his brother Kees Makkink, at the St Katharine Docks complex in London, a former industrial complex that was converted by the SPACE Foundation as a studio complex. There, in 1969 he was discovered by Stanley Kubrick who used two of his works in his film A Clockwork Orange (1971): Rocking Machine and Christ Unlimited. Coincidentally, the Italian filmmaker Tinto Brass also used Rocking Machine in his film Dropout, starring Vanessa Redgrave.

Makkink's partner was the British author, Julia Blackburn. In 1972 Makkink settled in Amsterdam, while making regular visits to Deià, Majorca. His first solo exhibition in the Wetering Gallery in Amsterdam took place in 1982, and the gallery has continued to feature his work ever since. In 1986 he was visiting professor at the ArtEZ Institute of the Arts.

From 1987 to 2000 he taught part-time at the Gerrit Rietveld Academie in Amsterdam. Makkink worked alternately in Bramfield (Suffolk), Molini di Triora-Agaggio, where he met and attended with great friendship the Italian-Chilean surrealist painter, Mauricio Stella, who lived in Molini di Triora. Then Amsterdam. In Amsterdam Makkink shared, for many years until his death, a studio with his former pupil Adriaan Rees. Makkink was controversial in Amsterdam. One of his sculptures – a tubular shape executed in brick at the Spinozahof – was demolished in 1994 because, according to local residents, it obstructed their view.

He died in Amsterdam on October 20, 2013.

Notable works
The following are commissioned public works in the Netherlands:

 1986 Four hollow shapes, Detroitdreef, Utrecht
 1987 Tunnel, Four Wind Avenue, Tilburg
 1987 Obelisk, Marnixplein, Rotterdam
 1987 Globe-form Sprengen Park, Apeldoorn - posted 1992
 1988 Twisted Towers (or Wokkels) Beijrincklaan, Waddinxveen
 Module 1988, Van Dam Isseltweg (Town Hall), Geldermalsen
 1990 Nine Lean Blocks, Leeghwaterpad (Water District), Almere
 1990 Disposable Cottage, Cornelis Lely Laan, Amsterdam
 1990 Stray House II, French Camp Heide, Bussum 
 1991 Planet Breedstraat, Utrecht
 1993 Butterfly Mill roundabout Anderlechtlaan / Sloterweg, Amsterdam
 1994 Ellipsoid Purmerland Chaussée (Municipal Office), Purmerend
 1996 Mondoide, Wassenaarseslag, Wassenaar
 1996 The Domain of the Swarm, Heteren
 1987/2001 Old Ground, Mauritskade, Amsterdam
 1997/2002 Ziggurat, Alphen aan den Rijn
 2003 Bolbewoners, Westerpark, Amsterdam

Personal life
He was married three times. He was survived by his daughter Fiona, two step-children, and his third wife and companion of several years, Julia Blackburn.

Gallery

References

External links

 Official website

1937 births
Art educators
Dutch male sculptors
20th-century Dutch sculptors
People from Winschoten
Artists from Amsterdam
A Clockwork Orange
2013 deaths